Marie-Josée Houle is a housing advocate and musician who lives in Ottawa, Ontario, Canada. On February 3, 2022 she was appointed as Federal Housing Advocate by Minister of Housing and Diversity Ahmed Hussen.

Biography
She was born in Val-d'Or, Quebec and grew up in Edmonton, Alberta.

Music career
Starting in the early 2000s, Houle hosted a radio show on Carleton University's radio station CKCU and was involved in many aspects of the Ottawa folk and independent music scene.  In 2007, she released her first solo album 'Our Lady of Broken Souls' which was nominated for a Best Folk Album award. It was recorded at Little Bullhorn Productions and was produced by Dave Draves. Musicians featured include Derek Loewen on drums and percussion, Aalya Ahmad on fiddle, Rob Skitmore on guitar and mando.

For her first show in Oslo, Norway, Houle opened for Norwegian sensation Girl From Saskatoon (featuring Arthur Holoein - who died in early 2012 - on string bass and Eirik Roald on cello). She quickly became friends with the band members and invited Arthur to join her for her first cross-Canada tour during the summer of 2007.

Her second release 'Monsters' (2008) was also recorded at Little Bullhorn Studios by Dave Draves and was completed in Oslo, Norway by producer Marius Gengenbach. The album featured Norwegian musicians Arthur Holoien on string bass and uke, Eirik Roald on cello, Ulk Knudsen on piano and Ida Malin Sanden on soprano sax. Canadian musicians include Derek Loewn on drums, Dave Draves on piano, Neil Gerster on guitar and Aalya Ahmad on fiddle. 'Monsters' was nominated for a Best Folk Album award in 2008.

Housing advocacy
Starting in 2004, Houle also started to get involved in housing advocacy and activism.

On February 3, 2022 she was appointed to a three-year term as Federal Housing Advocate by Minister of Housing and Diversity Ahmed Hussen.

References

External links
 Of accordions and cleavage - article in the Ottawa Citizen
 a playgrrround session in Vienna (Cruelle Poetesse, Shallow Breathing)

Living people
Canadian accordionists
Women accordionists
People from Val-d'Or
21st-century accordionists
Year of birth missing (living people)